William Wyche Fowler Jr. (born October 6, 1940) is an American attorney, politician, and diplomat. He is a member of the Democratic Party and served as a U.S. Senator from Georgia from 1987 to 1993. He had previously served in the U.S. House of Representatives from 1977 to 1987.

Early life and education
Fowler was born in Atlanta, Georgia. He attended Davidson College, and then served in the United States Army as an intelligence officer. After discharge, he returned to school to earn a J.D. degree from Emory University School of Law.

Career 
From 1965 to 1966, he became the chief of staff for Congressman Charles Weltner, and after holding this post for two years, he resigned to become a private attorney. From 1974 to 1977, he served as an Atlanta City Councilman, and he used this position as a stepping stone to the House.

U.S Congress
On April 5, 1977, Fowler was elected in a special election to the U.S. House of Representatives, to fill the vacancy caused by Andrew Young's resignation upon appointment as US Ambassador to the United Nations. He defeated John Lewis in the election.

In 1986, as a U.S. Representative, Fowler narrowly defeated the incumbent Republican Senator Mack Mattingly. Fowler served as the junior senator from Georgia. Fowler's voting record was liberal on social concerns and moderate on economic and national security issues.

On October 15, 1991, Fowler was one of eleven Democrats who voted to confirm the nomination of Clarence Thomas to the U.S. Supreme Court in a 52 to 48 vote, the narrowest margin of approval in more than a century.

He unexpectedly lost his re-election bid in 1992 to Georgia state Senator Paul Coverdell (who would later become leader of the state's Republican party). Fowler won a small plurality of the vote against Coverdell on general election night 1992, but Georgia law requires a runoff election between the two candidates with the highest vote totals if no one candidate receives over 50 percent (a majority) of the total vote, and a Libertarian Party candidate received enough votes to keep Fowler's total below 50 percent-plus-one. In the runoff on November 24, 1992, Coverdell upset Fowler by a narrow margin.

The New York Times noted that "he was the key figure in orchestrating a compromise on financing for the National Endowment for the Arts."

Post-Congress
After his re-election defeat, Fowler was selected to serve as the 22nd United States Ambassador to Saudi Arabia in the Clinton Administration. Fowler left after George W. Bush took office, and was succeeded by attorney Robert W. Jordan.

After leaving the position, Fowler joined the law firm of Powell, Goldstein, Frazer, and Murphy, and he joined several corporate and academic boards, including those of the Carter Center at Emory University and the Morehouse School of Medicine. He also became board chairman of the Middle East Institute and is a member of the ReFormers Caucus of Issue One.

Personal life
Fowler has been married at least twice. His second marriage in 1990 was to Donna Hulsizer, then the issues director for People for the American Way. He has a daughter and a son.

, Fowler lives in Georgia and West University Place, Texas, where he teaches part-time at Rice University.

References

External links

 New Georgia Encyclopedia 
 

1940 births
20th-century American lawyers
20th-century American politicians
21st-century American lawyers
Ambassadors of the United States to Saudi Arabia
Atlanta City Council members
Davidson College alumni
Democratic Party United States senators from Georgia (U.S. state)
Democratic Party members of the United States House of Representatives from Georgia (U.S. state)
Emory University School of Law alumni
Emory University alumni
Georgia (U.S. state) lawyers
Living people
Military personnel from Georgia (U.S. state)
Rice University faculty